Melanie Moore may refer to:
 Melanie Moore, winner of So You Think You Can Dance season 8
 Melanie Moore (basketball), American women's basketball coach at Xavier University
 Melanie Paxson (née Moore), American actress